Tatarchev Nunatak (‘Tatarchev Nunatak’ \ta-'tar-chev 'nu-na-tak\) is the rocky ridge rising to 645 m (central height) and 659 m (eastern one) and horseshoe-shaped, extending 3.2 km in north-south direction and 2.2 km in east-west direction on Oscar II Coast in Graham Land. It is part of the glacial divide between Hektoria Glacier to the west and Brenitsa Glacier to the east.  The feature is named after Hristo Tatarchev (1869-1952), a leader of the Bulgarian liberation movement in Macedonia.

Location
British mapping in 1978.

Maps
 British Antarctic Territory.  Scale 1:200000 topographic map.  DOS 610 Series, Sheet W 64 60.  Directorate of Overseas Surveys, Tolworth, UK, 1978.
 Antarctic Digital Database (ADD). Scale 1:250000 topographic map of Antarctica. Scientific Committee on Antarctic Research (SCAR). Since 1993, regularly upgraded and updated.

Notes

References
 Tatarchev Nunatak. SCAR Composite Antarctic Gazetteer.
 Bulgarian Antarctic Gazetteer. Antarctic Place-names Commission. (details in Bulgarian, basic data in English)

External links
 Tatarchev Nunatak. Copernix satellite image

Mountains of Graham Land
Oscar II Coast
Bulgaria and the Antarctic